La Bruyère is a commune in the Haute-Saône department in the region of Bourgogne-Franche-Comté, in eastern France.

It was the birthplace (1874) of Albert Mathiez, a prominent historian of the French Revolution, born to a very local innkeeper's family, who later moved to the city of Paris and achieved a successful academic career.

See also 
Communes of the Haute-Saône department

References 

Communes of Haute-Saône